Hans Conrad Werdmüller (20 July 1606 – 30 July 1674) was a Swiss military commander and a member of the city council of Zürich.

In the Swiss peasant war of 1653, he commanded the troops of Zürich, which were to put down the rebellion of the rural population.

References

Further reading
Weisz, L.: Die Werdmüller. Schicksale eines alten Zürcher Geschlechtes; Schulthess & Co., Zürich, 1949.

1606 births
1674 deaths
17th-century Swiss people
Swiss military personnel
Politicians from Zürich
17th-century Swiss military personnel
Military personnel from Zürich